The Architecture of the City is a seminal book of urban design theory by the Italian architect Aldo Rossi published in Padova in 1966. The book marks the shift from the urban doctrines of modernism to a rediscovery of the traditional European city.

Background
In this book, Rossi criticizes the lack of understanding of the city in current architectural practice. He argues that a city must be studied and valued as something constructed over time; of particular interest are urban artifacts that withstand the passage of time. Rossi held that the city remembers its past (our "collective memory"), and that we use that memory through monuments; that is, monuments give structure to the city. His book has been a major reference for the reconstruction of the city of Berlin after the German reunification in 1990. An English translation has been published in 1982.

References

Architecture books
Books about urbanism